"Candy" is a popular song. The music was written by Alex Kramer, the lyrics by Mack David and Joan Whitney. It was published in 1944.

First recordings
A recording by Johnny Mercer and the Pied Pipers, with Jo Stafford, was released by Capitol Records as catalog number 183. It first reached the Billboard magazine Best Seller chart on February 22, 1945, and lasted 15 weeks on the chart, peaking at #2.  Mercer recalled that the song was ideal for his limited range for ballad singing.

Another recording by Dinah Shore was released by RCA Victor Records as catalog number 20-1632. It reached the Billboard magazine Best Seller chart on April 5, 1945, at No. 10, its only week on the chart.

Later recordings
Big Maybelle's version of the song received the Grammy Hall of Fame Award in 1999 and went to No. 11 on the Billboard R&B chart in 1956.
Manhattan Transfer did a version of it on their self-titled album released April 2, 1975.

References

Songs with lyrics by Mack David
1944 songs
1945 singles
Jo Stafford songs
Songs written by Joan Whitney (songwriter)
Songs written by Alex Kramer
1940s jazz standards